Štefan Znám (9 February 1936, Veľký Blh – 17 July 1993, Bratislava) was a Slovak- Hungarian mathematician, believed to be the first to ponder Znám's problem in modern times.

Znám worked in the field of number theory and graph theory. He also co-founded journal Matematické obzory.

External links
Article on Štefan Znám in Matematický ústav SAV

Czechoslovak mathematicians
Slovak mathematicians
1936 births
1993 deaths
Comenius University alumni
Academic staff of Comenius University